Satyavashar Temple is a Siva temple in Matthur in Mayiladuthurai district in Tamil Nadu (India).

Vaippu Sthalam
It is one of the shrines of the Vaippu Sthalams sung by Tamil Saivite Nayanar Sambandar and Sundarar.

Presiding deity
The presiding deity is known as Satyavashar Temple. The Goddess is known as Soundaranayaki.

Mattur
Earlier this place was known as Mattur. Now it is called as Matthur.

References

Hindu temples in Mayiladuthurai district
Shiva temples in Mayiladuthurai district